Supralathosea pronuba is a species of mossy sallow in the family of moths known as Noctuidae. It was first described by William Barnes and James Halliday McDunnough in 1916 and it is found in North America.

The MONA or Hodges number for Supralathosea pronuba is 10035.

References

Further reading

 
 
 

Amphipyrinae
Articles created by Qbugbot
Moths described in 1916